An ephod ( ʾēfōḏ;  or ) was a type of apron, which according to the Hebrew Bible, was worn by the Jewish high priest the kohen gadol, an artifact and an object to be revered in ancient Israelite culture, and was closely connected with oracular practices and priestly ritual.

In the Books of Samuel and Books of Chronicles, David is described as wearing an ephod when dancing in the presence of the Ark of the Covenant (2 Samuel 6:14, 1 Chronicles 15:27) and one is described as standing in the sanctuary at Nob, with a sword behind it (1 Samuel 21:9). In the book of Exodus and in Leviticus one is described as being created for the High Priest to wear as part of his official vestments (Exodus 28:4+, 29:5, 39:2+; Leviticus 8:7).

Description
In the Bible, in the contexts where it is worn, the ephod is usually described as being linen, but did not constitute complete clothing of any kind, as the Books of Samuel describe. The book of 1 Chronicles states that David was "clothed with a robe of fine linen, as were all the Levites who bore the ark... [and] David also wore an ephod of linen," [NAS Bible translation; 1 Chronicles, 15:27] "and David was wearing a linen ephod" [NAS Bible translation; 2 Samuel, 6:14]. There appears to have been a strong religious and ceremonial implication to wearing an ephod, since the 85 priests at Nob are specifically identified as being the type of people who wore an ephod; though the Masoretic text here describes them as being linen ephods (1 Samuel 22:18) the word linen is not present in the Septuagint version of the passage, nor is it present when the Septuagint describes David and Samuel as girding themselves with an ephod. Therefore, some textual scholars regard its presence in the Masoretic text as a later editorial gloss.

Wearing and composition
A passage in the Book of Exodus describes the Ephod as an elaborate garment worn by the high priest, and upon which the Hoshen, or breastplate containing Urim and Thummim, rested. According to this description, the Ephod was woven out of gold, blue, purple, and scarlet threads, was made of fine linen, and was embroidered with skillful work in gold thread. Gideon is additionally described as creating an ephod made up of 1,700 shekels of gold. The Talmud argues that each of the textures was combined in six threads with a seventh of gold leaf, making 28 threads to the texture in total.(Tractate Yoma 72a) Some people attempt to assign meaning to the details of the Ephod, but such meanings are not given in either the biblical description or the Talmud.

The biblical description (Exodus 28:16, 39:9) continues describing the size of the breastplate which is affixed to the front of the ephod as a square measuring one span by one span (the width of an outstretched hand from little finger tip to out stretched thumb tip). Stating that it was held together by a girdle, and had two shoulder straps which were fastened to the front of the ephod by golden rings, to which the breastplate was attached by golden chains. From this description it appears to have been something like an apron or skirt with braces, though Rashi argued that it was like a woman's riding girdle. The biblical description also adds that there were two engraved gems over the shoulder straps (like epaulettes), made from shoham (thought by scholars to mean malachite, by Jewish tradition to mean heliodor, and in the King James Version translated as "onyx", and with the names of the 12 tribes written upon them; the classical rabbinical sources differ as to the order in which the tribes were named on the jewels (Sotah 36a).

Origins
Textual scholars attribute the description of the Ephod in Exodus to the priestly source and to a date later than the other mentions of Ephod; biblical scholars believe that the Ephod may have evolved over time into this highly ceremonial form from more primitive beginnings (the simple linen form described in the Books of Samuel), much like the manner in which the highly liturgical maniple evolved from an ordinary handkerchief.

Extended uses

Besides its use as a garment, an Ephod was also used for oracular purposes, in conjunction with Urim and Thummim; the books of Samuel imply that whenever Saul or David wished to question God via oracular methods, they asked a priest for the ephod. Since the oracular process is considered by scholars to have been one of cleromancy, with the Urim and Thummim being the objects which were drawn as lots, the Ephod is considered by scholars to have been some form of container for the Urim and Thummim; to harmonise this with the descriptions of the Ephod as a garment, it is necessary to conclude that the Ephod must have originally been some sort of pocket, which the priests girded to themselves. However, the biblical text states the Urim and Thummim were placed in the breastplate, not the ephod.  The integration of the stones in the breastplate, as well as the Hebrew usage of "Urim" as "lights," suggest that the Urim and Thummim may have been a type of ocular device through which the priest would look when receiving divine communication.

The object at Nob, which must have been somewhat freestanding since another object is kept behind it, and the objects made by Gideon and by Micah, from molten gold, logically cannot have just been garments. The object made by Gideon is plainly described as having been worshipped, and therefore the idol of some deity, while the object made by Micah is closely associated with a Teraphim, and the Ephod and Teraphim are described interchangeably with the Hebrew terms pesel and massekah, meaning graven image, and molten image, respectively.

Even the ephods used for oracular purposes were not necessarily just pieces of cloth, as they are not described as being worn, but carried (though some translations render 1 Samuel 2:28 as wear an ephod rather than carry an ephod); the Hebrew term used in these passages for carry is nasa, which specifically implies that the Ephod was carried either in the hand or on the shoulder. The conclusion thus is that Ephod, in these cases, referred to a portable idol, which the lots were cast in front of; some scholars have suggested that the connection between the idol and the garment is that the idol was originally clothed in a linen garment, and the term Ephod gradually came to describe the idol as a whole.

Other scholars suggest that the ephod originally refers to a container for the stones used to cast lots and later became associated with many objects that also could contain the stones or were used in divination.

According to the Talmud, the wearing of the ephod atoned for the sin of idolatry on the part of the Children of Israel.

Gideon went on to make an ephod out of the gold won in battle; according to Ginzberg's The Legends of the Jews: "..In the high priest's breastplate, Joseph was represented among the twelve tribes by Ephraim alone, not by Manasseh, too. To wipe out this slight upon his own tribe, Gideon made an ephod bearing the name of Manasseh. He consecrated it to God, but after his death homage was paid to it as an idol. In those days the Israelites were so addicted to the worship of Beelzebub that they constantly carried small images of this god with them in their pockets, and every now and then they were in the habit of bringing the image forth and kissing it fervently."; according to the Bible this action eventually caused the whole of Israel to turn away from God yet again and the ruin of Gideon and his family. Gideon had 70 sons from the many women he took as wives. He also had a Shechemite concubine who bore him a son whom he named Abimelech, which means "my father is king".

In apocryphal literature

According to the ancient apocryphal Lives of the Prophets, after the death of Zechariah Ben Jehoiada, the priests of the Temple could no more, as before, see the apparitions of the angels of the Lord, nor could make divinations with the Ephod, nor give responses from the Debir.

See also
Tetzaveh
Michnasayim
Ketonet
Avnet (kohen)
Mitznefet
Me'il
priestly breastplate
Tzitz

References

External links
Ephod
Recreation of the Ephod
Catholic Encyclopedia – Ephod
Verses where Ephod occurs (NASB)

Tabernacle and Temples in Jerusalem
Jewish religious clothing
Hebrew words and phrases in the Hebrew Bible
Hardstone carving
Ephod